Upsilon Tauri (υ Tauri) is a solitary, white-hued star in the zodiac constellation of Taurus, and is a member of the Hyades star cluster. It is faintly visible to the naked eye with an apparent visual magnitude of +4.3.  Based upon an annual parallax shift of 21.21 mas seen from Earth, it is around 154 light years from the Sun.

Properties
[[File:UpsilonTauLightCurve.png|thumb|left|A light curve for Upsilon Tauri, plotted from TESS data]]
This is an A-type main sequence star with a stellar classification of A8 Vn. It is classified as a Delta Scuti type variable star and its brightness varies from magnitude +4.28 to +4.31 with a period of 3.56 hours. At an estimated age of 827 million years, it is spinning rapidly with a rotation period of just 0.415 days. This is giving the star an oblate shape with an equatorial bulge that is 9% larger than the polar radius.

Occasionally this star system shares the Bayer designation υ Tauri with 72 Tauri, which is separated from it by 0.29° in the sky.

Naming
With φ, κ1, κ2 and χ, it composed the Arabic were the Arabs' Al Kalbain, the Two Dogs. According to the catalogue of stars in the Technical Memorandum 33-507 - A Reduced Star Catalog Containing 537 Named Stars, Al Kalbain were the title for five stars : φ as Alkalbain I, χ as Alkalbain II, κ1 as Alkalbain III, κ2 as Alkalbain IV and this star (υ) as Alkalbain V''.

References

Delta Scuti variables
A-type main-sequence stars
Hyades (star cluster)
Tauri, Upsilon
Taurus (constellation)
Durchmusterung objects
Tauri, 069
020711
028024
1392